The Boot Hill and Western Railway (abbreviated to BHWY), is a railway between Dodge City and Wilroads in Kansas owned by the Boot Hill and Western Railway Company. It consists of a single track section, about 26 miles long. It mainly transports agricultural products and has two interchanges, one with the BNSF Railway and another with the Cimarron Valley Railroad. The railway was given an exemption notice in 2005. Transport between Bucklin and Wilroads stopped in Autumn 2005 due to a lack of traffic, it has only operated eight trains since September 2000. The Boot Hill and Western Railway Company acquired part ownership of the track in September 2000 from the previous owner, the Dodge City Ford and Bucklin Railroad Company. It previously had a role in the interconnection with the Bucklin Union Pacific Railroad.

References

Kansas railroads